Lambs Green is a hamlet in the civil parish of Rusper and the Horsham District of West Sussex, England. It lies on the Rusper to Ifield road 3.1 miles (5 km) west of Crawley.

External links

Horsham District
Villages in West Sussex